Josiah Kibira University College (JoKUCo) is a constituent college of Tumaini University Makumira in Bukoba, Tanzania.

References

External links
 

Colleges in Tanzania
St. Augustine University of Tanzania
Educational institutions established in 2008
2008 establishments in Tanzania